Lenny Ibizarre  (born Lennart Krarup), is a Danish producer and musician from Copenhagen. He is known for his work as a DJ and record producer in Ibiza.

History 
Lenny Ibizarre emerged into the music scene in Ibiza in 1997 where he started work on his first album, The Ambient Collection, which was signed by Warner Music UK.

Since 1997, Lenny Ibizarre has produced 12 albums and is  a multi-platinum selling artist. His chilled Ibiza compilations sold over 1.5 million copies in the UK. The Ambient Collection reached its 7th edition in 2007.

Lenny Ibizarre is also a much respected remix artist favoring seasoned multi-platinum artists such as The Doors, Bob Dylan, Bob Marley, Jefferson Airplane, Nat King Cole and Henry Mancini.

As a DJ, Lenny Ibizarre has held residencies at Cafe Del Mar, Pacha, Khumaras, Ku (Privilege) and Amnesia.

In 1997, Lenny Ibizarre also founded his record label, Ibizarre Records and co-founded the annual international DJ Awards with Jose Pascual which reached their 18th anniversary in 2015.

In 2011, Lenny Ibizarre and Max Martire formed the "Aristofreeks" - an outlet for their remixing and producing. September 2013, Pacific Electronic Music record label was formed by Jerry L. Greenberg (former President of Atlantic Records), Max Martire & Lenny Ibizarre. Their first signing was Kathy Sledge of Sister Sledge.

References

External links 
  – record label of Lenny Ibizarre
  Lenny Ibizarre on MySpace
  Lenny Ibizarre on ClubMixed
 

Club DJs
Living people
Danish dance musicians
Danish electronic musicians
Danish house musicians
Remixers
Year of birth missing (living people)